Joseph Paul Adrien Carré (Montmorillon, France, 18 March 1870 – 2 March 1941) was a French architect practicing in Uruguay.

Literature
 
 

People from Montmorillon
1870 births
1941 deaths
20th-century French architects
French expatriates in Uruguay
Uruguayan architects